Muiraquitã (Brazilian Portuguese: /mujɾakiˈtɐ̃/, from Tupi mbïraki'tã, "knot of trees", from muyrá / mbyra, "tree", "stick", "wood" and quit, "knot", "wart", "rounded object") is the name given to various types of old artefacts of Amazonian Indian origin, carved in stone (primarily jade, nephrite) or wood, and representing animals (especially frogs, but also others such as fish and turtles) or people. Muiraquitãs are often used as pendants, amulets, and in other decorative capacities.

In Brazilian folklore, there are a number of legends associated with the muiraquitã, to which supernatural qualities are often attributed.

Historical information
The Muiraquitã, a carved green frog-shaped stone, was used as an amulet by the Tapajós women to prevent disease and avoid infertility. Their popularity spread around the Lower Amazon Basin and through to the Caribbean, where Muiraquitãs from the Amazon state in Brazil were found. "They must have been an object of exchange among elites," says archaeologist Marcondes Lima da Costa, Federal University of Pará. Fashion reached Europe in the eighteenth century when these amulets were taken to the Old Continent. It was believed that they prevented epilepsy and kidney stones. Today they are rare pieces that reach high prices at auctions.

==Legend==
The legend says that the amulet was offered as a gift by the Icamiaba female warriors to all those Indians who annually visited their camp at the river Nhamundá. Once a year, during a ceremony dedicated to the moon, the Icamiabas received the Guacaris warriors with whom they mated. At midnight, they dived into the river and brought up a greenish clay in their hands, which they molded into various forms: frogs, turtles or other animals, and presented these to their loved ones. Some versions say that this ritual would take place in an enchanted lake named Jaci uaruá ("mirror moon" in Old Tupi: îasy arugûá).
 
Retrieved from the bottom of the river and shaped by the women, the still soft clay hardened in contact with the elements. These objects were then strung on the strands of hair of their brides and used as amulets by their male warriors. To date, this amulet is considered a sacred object, believed to bring happiness and luck and also to cure almost all diseases. It is also found in Macunaíma, a well-known and internationally renowned literary work by Mário de Andrade.

See also
 Brazilian mythology
 Indigenous peoples in Brazil

Additional information

References

Sources

External links
Muiraquitã, from Pará Culture, Fauna and Flora 
Folclore: Muiraquitã 

Brazilian mythology
Indigenous culture in Brazil
Brazilian folklore
Indigenous culture of the Amazon
Indigenous sculpture of the Americas